KQEV-LP (104.7 MHz) is a low-power FM radio station licensed to Walnut, California. The station is owned by Chinese Sound of Oriental and West Heritage in Carson, California and airs a Chinese-language ethnic format.

References

External links
KQEV FM 104.7 - Chinese Radio in Los Angeles

QEV-LP
QEV-LP
Radio stations established in 2015
2015 establishments in California